The Copenhagen Masters is a high-ranking tournament in badminton. It is an invitation tournament held annually since 1993 in the week between Christmas and New Year in Copenhagen. The Danish top players meet thereby the remaining world point leaders. The venue was in the first eleven years the Cirkusbyningen, an old circus. Since 2004 it takes place on timber flooring in the Falconer Centret. In 2016 and 2017, the tournament will not be held due to a renovation of the venue.

Previous champions

References

External links
Badminton Denmark Homepage
2010 Results
2011 Results
2012 Results
2013 Results
2014 Results
2015 Results

 
Badminton tournaments in Denmark
International sports competitions in Copenhagen
1993 establishments in Denmark
Recurring sporting events established in 1993
Winter events in Denmark